Gevence is a village in the Nizip District, Gaziantep Province, Turkey. The village is inhabited by Turkmens of the Barak tribe.

References

Villages in Nizip District